European buffalo may refer to:

 Aurochs, the wild ancestor of domestic cattle
 European bison or wisent
 Bubalus murrensis, an extinct species of water buffalo that occupied riverine habitats in Europe in the Pleistocene

See also 
 Buffalo (disambiguation)

Animal common name disambiguation pages